Kunal Khemu (born Kunal Ravi Kemmu; 25 May 1983) is an Indian actor who works in Hindi cinema.

Early life and background
Kunal Ravi Kemmu was born in Srinagar, Jammu and Kashmir, India on 25 May 1983 into a Kashmiri Pandit family to actors Ravi Kemmu & Jyoti Kemmu. He is the older child to the couple and has a younger sister named Karishma Kemmu. He stayed in Srinagar in early years and got initial education from Burn Hall School, but shifted to Jammu after the Insurgency in Kashmir during the 1990s for being a Kashmiri Hindu. Later, his family stayed in Mira Road area of Mumbai, Maharashtra. He finished his schooling from St.xaviers High School in Andheri East; and later attended SVKM's Narsee Monjee College of Commerce and Economics in Vile Parle for his further studies. He now lives in Khar, Mumbai.

His grandfather, Moti Lal Kemmu (original spelling of last name) is a Kashmiri playwright and a recipient of several awards by the government of Jammu and Kashmir: Rashtra Bhasa Prachar Samiti, Sahitya Akademi award in 1982 for his contribution to Kashmiri literature as a playwright and Padma Shri.

Personal life

Khemu was in a relationship with actress Soha Ali Khan Pataudi since May 2013. The couple got engaged in July 2014 and got married in a private ceremony in Mumbai on 25 January 2015 in the presence of selected members of Soha's Family. Through his marriage to Khan, he is related to the Pataudi family.On 29 September 2017, Khan gave birth to their daughter Inaaya Naumi Khemu.

Career
Kunal made his debut as a child actor appearing in the Doordarshan TV series Gul Gulshan Gulfaam (1987), directed by Ved Rahi. He made his film debut with Mahesh Bhatt's movie Sir (film) (1993). He went on to star as a child artist in movies including Raja Hindustani, Zakhm, Bhai, Hum Hain Rahi Pyar Ke, and Dushman.

He played the male lead in the 2005 film Kalyug, which was directed by Mohit Suri. Kalyug was based on the pornography industry. In 2007, his first release was Madhur Bhandarkar's Traffic Signal, where he played a street-smart money lender who lends money to poor families, but always gets it back with interest.

His second release of 2007 was Dhol in which he again played lead. In 2008, in his only release, Superstar, he featured in a double role. In 2009, he starred in Dhoondte Reh Jaaoge and Jai Veeru. In 2009, he appeared in the comic-thriller 99. In 2010, he appeared in Golmaal 3 in which he played a supporting role as Laxman.

In 2012, he appeared in Mukesh Bhatt's Blood Money, in which played the lead role as Kunal Kadam, an honest and hard worker who is unknowingly taken into the dark side of Diamond Trade by his Boss. He co-starred in Go Goa Gone, a Zombie comedy film, which was released on 10 May 2013. Both the films fared well at the box office.

In 2015, after over a two-year break, Kunal returned to the screen with the thriller Bhaag Johnny about a man who gets to live two lives by the help of a Jinn, portrayed by director Vikram Bhatt. Though the film began shooting in 2013, it released on 25 September 2015 to mixed reviews and low box office collections. His second release of the same year was the comedy film Guddu Ki Gun, in which Kunal appears in the title role along with Sumeet Vyas. In 2017, he did a voice over in an animated film Hanuman: Da' Damdaar in role of Lord Indra. He also appeared in the fourth installment of Golmaal (film series) named Golmaal Again reprising his famous role of Laxman Sharma. He portrayed a noteworthy negative character in Malang and gained critical acclaim for his role in Kalank .

ZEE5 team will go on the release the Abhay Season 2 in September 2020 and the streaming will be in October 2020. Kunal Khemu playing main role in this web series. This series directed by Ken Ghosh. He will return as the investigating officer in Season 3 as well.

Filmography

Films

Web series

Television

Short Film

Awards and nominations

References

External links

 

1983 births
Living people
20th-century Indian male actors
Kashmiri people
Kashmiri Hindus
People from Srinagar
Male actors in Hindi cinema
Indian male film actors
Indian Hindus
Indian male child actors
21st-century Indian male actors
Male actors from Jammu and Kashmir
Kashmiri Pandits
Indian people of Kashmiri descent